This is a list of general aviation operators that have an air operator's certificate issued by the Civil Aviation Authority of New Zealand.

See also 
List of airlines of New Zealand
List of defunct airlines of New Zealand
List of airlines

References

External links
 

 
Airlines
Airlines